The R760 road is a regional road in County Wicklow, Ireland. It connects the R117 road in Enniskerry to the R755.

The R760 provides access to the Powerscourt Estate.

References

Regional roads in the Republic of Ireland
Roads in County Wicklow